Anisimovskaya is a rural locality (a village) in Sibirskoye Rural Settlement, Verkhovazhsky District, Vologda Oblast, Russia. The population was 7 as of 2002.

Geography 
The distance to Verkhovazhye is 43 km, to Yeliseyevskaya is 12 km. Aksenovskaya is the nearest rural locality.

References 

Rural localities in Verkhovazhsky District